Jakub Kroner (born 1987) is a Slovak filmmaker. His second feature film, Lóve (2011), became the box office number-one Slovak-language film of the year in his home country, while ranked the third highest-grossing ever since the independent Slovakia. As the youngest generation member of the Kroner acting family, he is the son of Janko Kroner and a grandson of Jozef himself.

Filmography
As director
 2006: Čo nás spája (short film)
 2009: BRATISLAVAfilm (also screenwriter, editor, camera operator and actor; as Maťo)
 2009: Hvezdár (short animated film; also screenwriter, animator)
 2011: Lóve (also screenwriter)
 2011: Lokal TV (TV animated series; also screenwriter, voice actor)
 2015: LokalFilmis 
 2019: Šťastný nový rok 
 2021: Šťastný nový rok 2
 2022: Šťastný nový rok 3
 2023: Šťastný nový rok 4
 2024: Šťastný nový rok 5 (in production)

As actor-only
 1997: Amálka, ja sa zbláznim! (TV film)

See also
 List of Slovak films
 List of people surnamed Kroner

References

Sources

External links
 InOut Studio (Film production company)

 
 Jakub Kroner at FDb.cz
 
 Jakub Kroner at Kinobox.cz
 
 

Jakub
1987 births
Living people
Slovak male film actors
Slovak film directors
Slovak male television actors
20th-century Slovak male actors
Slovak experimental filmmakers